Tron: Uprising (stylized as TRON: Uprising) is an American animated science fiction television series, part of the larger Tron franchise. It is set between the Tron and Tron: Legacy films, and takes place sometime after similar tie-ins Tron: Evolution and Tron: Betrayal.  
A total of 19 episodes have been produced and aired 
on Disney XD in the United States from May 18, 2012, to January 28, 2013. The series is directed by Charlie Bean, who also acts as executive producer; Edward Kitsis, Adam Horowitz, and Justin Springer serve as consulting producers.

Synopsis
Beck is a young program who becomes the leader of a revolution inside the computer world of the Grid against the villainous Clu and his henchmen. A mechanic, he is trained by Tron, the greatest warrior the Grid has ever known. Tron not only trains Beck in the fighting and light cycle skills to challenge the brutal military occupation of the city of Argon, but also guides and mentors him to grow beyond his youthful, impulsive nature into a courageous and powerful leader. Beck adopts Tron's persona and becomes the enemy of General Tesler and his oppressive forces.

Characters

Main characters
 Beck (voiced by Elijah Wood) – The protagonist of the series. Beck is a young program who leads a revolution against Clu. He is trained by Tron and he challenges the evil forces of Tesler and Clu. Beck is referred to by the public as "Tron" and "the Renegade".
 Tron (voiced by Bruce Boxleitner) – The original protector of the Grid, Tron was supposedly killed by Clu. However, Tron survived that battle with injuries. Unable to protect the Grid, Tron sought out a new protector and found Beck, whom he vowed to train. In "Scars", it is revealed Dyson also scarred the left side of his face. He is later fully healed in "Terminal"
 Mara (voiced by Mandy Moore) – A co-worker and one of Beck's friends at Able's Garage. Saved early in the series by Beck, Mara becomes one of the most dedicated, and optimistic believers in Tron's return and the Renegade's actions, often supporting him openly and questioning the official news reports painting the Renegade as a terrorist.
 Zed (voiced by Nate Corddry) – A co-worker and friend of Beck's at Able's Garage. Due to his long-standing romantic interest in Mara, Zed becomes jealous of her fanatical support of the Renegade and becomes opposed to the extreme actions being taken against the established regime. Beck often makes this worse by taking advantage of Zed while acting as the Renegade, reinforcing Zed's ill-feelings.
 General Tesler (voiced by Lance Henriksen) – Clu's henchman and the main antagonist of the series. Tesler was originally tasked with eliminating rumours of Tron's survival and suppressing reports of Tron's return. He rarely participates in action directly, but when he does has shown himself to be a capable combatant and tactician.
 Paige (voiced by Emmanuelle Chriqui) – A young program who is one of Tesler's field commanders. While hardened and dedicated, she is less antagonistic than Tesler and takes a personal interest in the new "Tron". Originally a medical program, Paige volunteered to be reformatted as a soldier after surviving what she believed to be an ISO attack, unaware that the killings she witnessed were done under Tesler's orders.
 Able (voiced by Reginald VelJohnson) – The owner of Able's Garage (which is the best repair shop in Argon City). Able is fully aware that Tron is still alive, and is one of the first to discover Beck's double life. While not openly supporting Beck, Able often allows him leeway from his regular duties and covers for Beck's absences from work. In "No Bounds", he is killed by Cyrus, when the bomb he took off of Zed and Mara got reactivated.
 Pavel (voiced by Paul Reubens) – Tesler's second-in-command. Although Pavel has been with Tesler far longer than Paige, his sadistic tendencies and lack of finesse often leads to Paige being given duties which require a more positive public image. This has led Pavel's loyalty to Tesler to be stretched, as well as damaging his working relationship with Paige.
 The Grid (voiced by Tricia Helfer) – The main setting of the Tron universe.

Recurring characters
 Clu (voiced by Fred Tatasciore) – The updated version of the original Clu from the original Grid, he was created by Kevin Flynn (the creator of the Grid). Clu betrayed Flynn and Tron then took over the Grid.
 Tatasciore also voices Kevin Flynn (Clu's original user) in episode 9 "Scars Part 1".
 Bartik (voiced by Donald Faison) – A program who joined a task force formed by Paige to hunt down the Renegade. He and his friend Hopper are shown sometimes picking on Zed and some of the workers. In "Terminal", he and Hopper later decided to switch sides and protect the Renegade after witnessing the workers stand up to Pavel.
 Hopper (voiced by Paul Scheer) – A program who joined a task force formed by Paige to hunt down the Renegade. He is Bartik's friend, like Bartik, he sometimes picks on Zed and some of the workers. IN "Terminal", he and Bartik later decided to switch sides and protect the Renegade after witnessing the workers stand up to Pavel.
 Dyson (voiced by John Glover) – A former friend turned traitor of Tron. Dyson betrayed Tron by joining Clu's army and he is now Clu's higest and most dangerous operative.
 Perl (voiced by Kate Mara) – A female member of a criminal gang who lures Zed into bringing her into Able's Garage, where she stole the ENCOM 786 lightcycle. She was later arrested by Paige.
 Cyrus (voiced by Aaron Paul) – Cyrus is Tron's first Renegade. After Tron was beaten by Dyson, Cyrus stepped in to save Tron. Cyrus then became the first "Renegade" before Beck. However, he believed that in order to free the grid, he should destroy it. Tron, upset that Cyrus saw things differently, imprisoned Cyrus in a crack in the grid, provided by Able. Cyrus then meets up with Beck and explains that he is the first renegade. Cyrus used Beck, along with himself, as battery power to thereby "freeing" the programs oppressed by Clu. He broke out of the compressed space, but fell back when Beck broke free. However, Cyrus escaped and caused havoc as the Renegade, blaming his crimes on Beck.
 Keller (voiced by Marcia Gay Harden) – A scientific program initially employed by Tesler to brainwash the programs of Argon City into obeying Clu.  When she witnesses the brutality of Tesler's regime and her brainwashing device is destroyed by the Renegade, she flees the city, pursued by Beck and Paige.
 Cutler (voiced by Lance Reddick) – A veteran of the Isomorphic Algorithm (ISO) wars. He fought for the ISOs and wore an armband as a sign of his past. Cutler went to Argon City after hearing about the "Renegade." He returns in "Terminal", where it is revealed he was captured and repurposed by Clu.
 Quorra (voiced by Olivia Wilde) – The last surviving ISO.
 Link (voiced by David Arquette) – A minor character who often appears in the background in major key events. He is a mechanic who works in Able's garage, and friend of Beck and Mara. He is quiet, and rather clumsy, causing accidents and irritation among his workplace. He is often ignored by his peers, and given menial tasks much to his frustration. He was once approached by Pavel, who easily manipulated him to falsely testify the identity of the "Renegade" in exchange for a vehicle. Despite this, he has shown admiration for the "Renegade", and is seen among the rebellion in the final episode.
 Gorn (voiced by Kathryn Hunter) – A technician operating in Purgos, Argon City's ghetto. She specializes in erasing or modifying memories of various programs, and is often tasked with this by Pavel when he orchestrates a frame-up. Ultimately, she is herself mutilated and rendered mute in order to keep silent about Pavel's schemes.

Episodes

Production

Design
The series features an animation style that mixes 2D animation and CGI animation. The look of the series was inspired by Star Wars: The Clone Wars,  ThunderCats, and Aeon Flux.

Director Charlie Bean explained 'the idea was to create a distinct style for the CG show not seen elsewhere on television or in film.' He worked closely with art director Alberto Mielgo, character designer Robert Valley (animation artist for the Gorillaz music videos) and lead vehicle designer Daniel Simon, who was previously responsible for many vehicle designs in the Tron: Legacy feature film, including the light cycles. Mielgo won the Primetime Emmy Award for his art direction in 2013.

Casting
In December 2010, it was announced that Elijah Wood, Bruce Boxleitner, Lance Henriksen, Emmanuelle Chriqui, Mandy Moore, Paul Reubens, Nate Corddry and Reginald VelJohnson would voice characters in a television series based on the Tron franchise, titled Tron: Uprising.

Cancellation
On January 14, 2013, producer Edward Kitsis responded to rumors of cancellation by stating, "I don't know what the future [of Tron: Uprising] is now. I know at the present, I can say we need more viewers." Disney XD moved the program in the broadcast schedule to Monday mornings at 12:00 AM Eastern until the first season episodes finished airing on January 28, 2013. After the last episode of the first season aired, no more episodes of Tron: Uprising have been produced.

Release

Marketing
Disney XD presented CGI models of characters, concept art, and the original trailer that was with the home releases of Tron: Legacy at San Diego Comic Con 2011. The prelude episode was broadcast only on Disney Channel, and was originally going to be a 10-part miniseries.

Netflix
On May 9, 2013, it was announced that Disney had reached an agreement with Netflix wherein Tron: Uprising would appear on the streaming service, however it was removed one year later.

Disney+
The full series is available for streaming on Disney+, which released in November 2019.

Music 

The series is scored by Joseph Trapanese, who arranged Daft Punk's score for Tron: Legacy.

Track listing

Reception

Critical response
The series premiere earned mostly positive reviews. It also currently holds an 8.8 rating on TV.com, and 8.1 rating from 7,064 users on IMDb.com. "Beck's Beginning" was given a positive review, with IGN ranking it 8 out of 10.

Awards and nominations

References

External links
 
 

2010s American animated television series
2012 American television series debuts
2013 American television series endings
2010s American science fiction television series
2013 soundtrack albums
Teen animated television series
American children's animated action television series
American children's animated adventure television series
American children's animated drama television series
American children's animated science fiction television series
American children's animated superhero television series
American computer-animated television series
Anime-influenced Western animated television series
Dystopian animated television series
Cyberpunk television series
Disney Channel original programming
Disney XD original programming
English-language television shows
Interquel television series
Animated television shows based on films
Television series based on Disney films
Television series by Disney Television Animation
Tron (franchise)
Walt Disney Records soundtracks
Works set in computers
Works about revolutions